Dona nobis pacem (Latin for "Grant us peace") is a phrase in the Agnus Dei section of the mass. The phrase, in isolation, has been appropriated for a number of musical works, which include:

Classical music  
 "Dona nobis pacem", a traditional round
 Dona nobis pacem, fugue by Ludwig van Beethoven (now thought genuine), Hess Anh. 57 (1795)
 Dona nobis pacem, cantata by Ralph Vaughan Williams (1936)
 Title of the third movement of Symphonie Liturgique by Arthur Honegger (1945)
 Title of a choral work by Ann Loomis Silsbee (1981)
 Dona nobis pacem for choir and orchestra by the Latvian composer, Pēteris Vasks (1996)
 Title of section of Adiemus V: Vocalise by Karl Jenkins (2003)

Literature 
 "Dona Nobis Pacem" is repeatedly quoted in Graham Greene's 1938 novel Brighton Rock by its antihero Pinkie Brown.
 "Dona Nobis Pacem" is used in Graham Greene's 1966 novel The Comedians.

Other 
 Included in Bobby Darin's 1960 Christmas album The 25th Day of December
 The title of a song, from the Present from Nancy LP by the Dutch band Supersister (1970)
 At the end of Pray Your Gods by Toad the Wet Sprocket (1992)
 Included in an arrangement of "I Heard the Bells on Christmas Day" recorded by Wayne Watson on One Christmas Eve (1994)
 A song performed by cast members (as an impromptu choir) in the 1978 M*A*S*H Christmas episode "Dear Sis."
 Bass guitarist Michael Manring performs an instrumental version on the 1993 Windham Hill compilation A Winter's Solstice IV.
 Clarinetist Richard Stoltzman performs a song on the 1996 Windham Hill compilation The Carols of Christmas.
 A setting by David Fanshawe, on the 1994 recording of African Sanctus.
 One track of the album No Boundaries, by Ladysmith Black Mambazo (2006)
 Track 12 of the album Whiskey Tango Ghosts, by Tanya Donelly (2004)
 The phrase is used by the Doctor - season 4, episode 6 of Doctor Who, "The Poison Sky" - when speaking in code to Donna Noble who is trapped on the TARDIS by the Sontarans. (Original airdate: 3 May 2008)
 Sister Steven, a character in the comic strip 9 Chickweed Lane repeatedly uses the phrase when her patience is being tried. 
 The phrase is repeated in the song "Old City (Instrumental)" on the album Instrumentals by the Shanghai Restoration Project (2008).
 The title of a track in the Max Richter score for the HBO show The Leftovers.
 The title of a composition by Motoi Sakuraba in Tales of Destiny 2 and featured throughout the series.
 A song performed by an unnamed family in season 3, episode 11 of The Handmaid's Tale, "Liars".

References

External links

Latin religious words and phrases